The tufted tit-spinetail (Leptasthenura platensis) is a species of bird in the family Furnariidae. It is found in Argentina, Brazil, Paraguay, and Uruguay. Its natural habitats are subtropical or tropical moist lowland forests, subtropical or tropical dry shrubland, and subtropical or tropical moist shrubland.

References

tufted tit-spinetail
Birds of Argentina
Birds of Uruguay
tufted tit-spinetail
Taxonomy articles created by Polbot
Taxa named by Ludwig Reichenbach